Omniturm is a skyscraper in Frankfurt, Germany. It was built by the U.S. real estate company Tishman Speyer Properties from early 2016, and was completed in 2019. The building reaches a height of 190 metres, making it the 6th-tallest building in Frankfurt and in Germany upon completion. The name (from Latin omnis 'everyone') is an allusion to the usage of the building, including both residential and office space.

Design 
The tower was designed by Bjarke Ingels Group.

The Omni Tower is notably characterized by a "swing" halfway up the building. The spiral axis shift from the center enables terraces for the living area, which is planned between the 14th and 23rd floors. In the largest shift, the so-called “residential” area is offset by a total of more than 5 meters from the baseline. The 49 story tower contains 43,850 square meters of rentable office space, 8,175 square meters of living space and 1,579 square meters of publicly accessible area.

According to Designbloom, "the lower part of the building is organized as a slender and rational stack, before the floorplates start to slide outwards in a spiraling motion where the tower contains residential programming. in its uppermost portion, the structure returns to a simple tower block, rejoining the orientation of the floors below".

Usage 
Omniturm is a mixed-used tower. The building has a leasable area of more than 54,100 square meters, with around 44,200 square meters as. flexible office space. 147 premium-apartments account for a further 8,200 square meters.

Owner 
The building was purchased by Commerz Real, an investment asset manager for Commerzbank in 2018.

Skyscrapers in Frankfurt

References

External links 

 Official Website

Skyscrapers in Frankfurt